Rio Vista is an unincorporated community in Richmond County, in the U.S. state of Virginia.

References

Unincorporated communities in Virginia
Unincorporated communities in Richmond County, Virginia